Kelly Madsen is a South African field hockey player who plays for the South Africa women's national field hockey team.

She made her senior international debut in 2009 after being part of the 2009 Women's Hockey Junior World Cup. She featured in 2 Women's Hockey World Cup tournaments in 2010 and in 2014. She also competed at the Commonwealth Games with the national team in 2010.

References

External links

Living people
South African female field hockey players
Field hockey players at the 2010 Commonwealth Games
Commonwealth Games competitors for South Africa
Year of birth missing (living people)
21st-century South African women